The A class is a class of minehunter vessels in the Turkish Navy. In 1999, the German shipyards Lürssen and Abeking & Rasmussen were contracted to build six  ships for the Turkish Navy, a purchase worth US$630 million. While the first vessel was built in Germany, later ships were constructed by the Istanbul Naval Shipyard.

The Turkish Navy has become the second naval force in the world, after the German Navy, to use a non-magnetic steel hull in its minehunter vessels.

See also 
Lists of ships of the Turkish Navy

References

Mine warfare vessel classes
Frankenthal-class minehunters
Minehunters of the Turkish Navy